Will Grant Oliver Attenborough (born 26 June 1991) is a British actor known for his roles in Photograph 51, Our Girl, Dunkirk, and The Outpost.

Career 
He played the lead role in Jeremy Herrin's production of Another Country in the West End, and starred opposite Nicole Kidman onstage in Photograph 51. He has had roles in Sam Mendes-produced The Hollow Crown, Channel 4's Utopia, Home Fires, Denial starring Rachel Weisz, and the Oscar-winning Dunkirk.

Attenborough won The Moth London Grandslam in 2018. In 2019, he played Ed Faulkner, a veteran of the Battle of Kamdesh, in The Outpost, based on Jake Tapper's book on the War in Afghanistan. He stars in BBC One's Our Girl as Oliver Hurst.

Attenborough is an advocate for Fossil Free UK and helped secure mayor of London Sadiq Khan's commitment to divest City Hall's £5bn pension fund of fossil fuel stocks. In 2017, Attenborough launched a campaign, with actress Leila Mimmack and Mark Rylance, for Equity, the performers' union, to move its fossil fuel investments into clean energy.

Personal life
Attenborough identifies as queer.

He is the son of theatre director Michael Attenborough and actress Karen Lewis. He is the grandson of actor-director Richard Attenborough and actress Sheila Sim, as well as great-nephew of naturalist, Sir David Attenborough.

He is Jewish. His great-grandparents also adopted two Jewish refugee girls from the Kindertransport.

Filmography

Film

Television

References

External links

British male film actors
British male stage actors
British environmentalists
Living people
1991 births
People educated at St Paul's School, London